Matías Verón (born 30 November 1993) is an Argentine professional footballer who plays as an attacking midfielder for Aizawl in the I-League.

Club career
Born in Argentina, Matías made his senior debut with Argentine side Tiro Federal de Morteros. Unfortunately, he couldn't make any appearances.

In July 2016, Verón moved to Libertad featuring in the Torneo Argentino A.

In 2017, Verón was transferred to Argentine side Club Juventud Unida Rio Cuarto.

On 21 January 2020, Matías penned a deal with the Indian I-League side Aizawl and secured 8 appearances and scored his maiden goal on 9 February 2020 against East Bengal. He rejoined the club in 2022.

References

1993 births
Living people
Argentine footballers
Association football midfielders
Torneo Argentino A players
Aizawl FC players
I-League players
Argentine expatriate footballers
Argentine expatriate sportspeople in India
Expatriate footballers in India
Sportspeople from Santa Fe Province